Selena Gomez is an American singer, songwriter, and actress. In 2008, Gomez signed a record deal with Hollywood Records. Gomez later formed a band named Selena Gomez & the Scene. In 2009, Gomez released her first extended play (EP), Another Cinderella Story, by Razor & Tie. Selena Gomez & the Scene released their debut album, Kiss & Tell in 2009. Their second album, A Year Without Rain was released in 2010 and their third album, When the Sun Goes Down, in 2011. Gomez announced the band would take a hiatus while Gomez focused on her acting career. In 2013, she confirmed that she would be releasing her solo debut album, as opposed to another album with her band. The result was Stars Dance, released on July 19, 2013. Stars Dance is an album rooted stylistically in EDM and pop, this later specifically showcased as electropop.

Having spent seven years with Hollywood Records, Gomez signed a recording contract with Interscope Records in 2014. To officially end her contract with Hollywood Records, Gomez released the compilation album For You (2014). Her second studio album, Revival was released on October 9, 2015. Revival is primarily a dance-pop and electropop album with R&B vibes, which has been also described as "a heady mix of electronic dance music pop". The album was met with a positive reaction from critics, who praised the album's production and lyrical content.

Songs

Notes

References

Gomez, Selena